Philophuga viridis is a species of ground beetle in the family Carabidae. It is found in North America.

Subspecies
These four subspecies belong to the species Philophuga viridis:
 Philophuga viridis amoena (LeConte, 1846)
 Philophuga viridis horni Chaudoir, 1877
 Philophuga viridis klamathea Larson, 1969
 Philophuga viridis viridis (Dejean, 1831)

References

Further reading

 

Harpalinae
Articles created by Qbugbot
Beetles described in 1831